The members of the 3rd General Assembly of Newfoundland were elected in the Newfoundland general election held in 1842. The General Assembly sat from January 14, 1843 to 1848.

The General Assembly had not sat from 1841 to 1843 as the colony's constitution had been suspended. Following the passing of the Newfoundland Act of 1842 by the British Parliament, the elected assembly and appointed Legislative Council were combined into a single unicameral legislature. The legislature continue to meet at the Old Court House until 1846 when that building was destroyed in a fire; for the next two years, the legislature met in a classroom in an orphan asylum.

James Crowdy was chosen as speaker.

In 1843, a new Education Act was passed which redistributed education funding between separate Protestant and Catholic school systems.

Sir Henry Prescott served as civil governor of Newfoundland until 1846. Robert Law served as colonial administrator until the arrival of Sir John Le Marchant in April 1847.

Members of the Assembly 
The following members were elected to the assembly in 1837:

Notes:

By-elections 
By-elections were held to replace members for various reasons:

Notes:

Members of the Legislative Council 
The following members were appointed to the Legislative Council:

References 

Newfoundland
003